Hypostomus corantijni is a species of catfish in the family Loricariidae. It is native to South America, where it occurs in the Courantyne River basin. The species reaches 18.8 cm (7.4 inches) SL.

References 

Hypostominae
Fish described in 1968
Freshwater fish of South America
Taxa named by Marinus Boeseman